Korong Vale is a demolished railway station, located at the junction of the Robinvale and Kulwin railway lines, in the township of Korong Vale, Victoria, Australia. Only freight trains use the line though the station.

At the peak of operations, the station had an island platform with footbridge access, two signal boxes, a marshalling yard, goods platform and shed, and a weighbridge. Rationalisation was carried out in the 1980s.

At the southern (Melbourne) end of the station site is a passing loop, while at the northern end is the junction of the two lines. A water tower and standpipe for steam locomotives is also located at the station.

During rationalisation, on 30 June 1987, the staff and ticket between Korong Vale and Charlton/Wycheproof was replaced with electric staff.

References

Disused railway stations in Victoria (Australia)